Ocrisiodes bamella is a species of snout moth in the genus Ocrisiodes. It was described by Hans Georg Amsel in 1958 and is known from Iran.

References

Moths described in 1958
Phycitinae
Taxa named by Hans Georg Amsel